Al Malagim District is a district of the Al Bayda Governorate, Yemen. As of 2003, the district had a population of  29,573 inhabitants.

References

Districts of Al Bayda Governorate
Al Malagim District